The Mongolian ground jay (Podoces hendersoni) or Henderson's ground jay, is a species of bird in the family Corvidae.

Description
The bird is light tan with iridescent blue on its primary feathers. It has a long, curved beak and a black stripe on its forehead.

Distribution
It is found in arid areas of Central Asia (Mongolia, northern China and adjacent areas of Russia and Kazakhstan).

Behaviour
Females spend more time foraging and the males spend more time brooding the chicks at the start of the nesting period. The main diet of the nestling Mongolian ground jay consists of common lizards, toad-headed agama, and invertebrates. It is proposed that Mongolian ground jays feed their chicks based on the availability of their food rather than in relation to the stage of the chicks development.

References

External links
 Image

Mongolian ground jay
Birds of North China
Birds of Mongolia
Mongolian ground jay
Taxonomy articles created by Polbot